Karavan (trans. Caravan) is the ninth studio album from Serbian and former Yugoslav rock band Galija. Karavan is the last album  that was recorded in cooperation with the lyricist Radoman Kanjevac.

In 2021 the album was polled 87th on the list of 100 best Serbian rock albums published after the breakup of SFR Yugoslavia. The list was published in the book Kako (ni)je propao rokenrol u Srbiji (How Rock 'n' Roll in Serbia (Didn't) Came to an End).

Track listing
"Petlovi" (Traditional) – 2:45
"Ja sam sam" (N. Milosavljević, R. Kanjevac, P. Milosavljević) – 3:47
"Dodirni me" (N. Milosavljević, O. Jezdić, P. Milosavljević) – 3:42
"Ne mogu da tebe ne poželim" (N. Milosavljević, R. Kanjevac) – 3:55
"Ja nisam odavde" (N. Milosavljević, R. Kanjevac, P. Milosavljević) - 4:38
"Pevajmo" (N. Milosavljević, R. Kanjevac) – 3:05
"Život je lep" (N. Milosavljević, R. Kanjevac) – 3:22
"Nedelja" (N. Milosavljević, R. Kanjevac, O. Jezdić) – 3:36
"Mlada, lepa i pametna" (N. Milosavljević, B. Milošević, R. Kanjevac) – 4:41
"Karavan" (N. Milosavljević, B. Zlatković, P. Milosavljević, R. Kanjevac) – 3:30
"Narode moj" (N. Milosavljević, P. Milosavljević, R. Kanjevac) – 4:16
"Moj brat i ja" (N. Milosavljević, P. Milosavljević, R. Kanjevac) – 4:48
"Otkad te nema" (N. Milosavljević, R. Kanjevac) – 3:40
"Ne idi" (N. Milosavljević, P. Milosavljević) – 3:49
"Okreni Beograd" (N. Milosavljević, R. Kanjevac) – 2:31
"Veruj mi" (N. Milosavljević, R. Kanjevac) – 3:00
"Uzalud se trudiš" (N. Milosavljević, P. Milosavljević, R. Kanjevac) – 3:30
"Šta ću ti sad" (N. Milosavljević, R. Kanjevac) – 2:46

Personnel
Nenad Milosavljević - vocals, acoustic guitar, harmonica
Predrag Milosavljević - vocals
Dragutin Jakovljević - guitar
Oliver Jezdić - keyboards, programming
Branislav Milošević - bass guitar
Boban Pavlović - drums

Guest musicians
Dragan Jovanović - acoustic guitar

Legacy
In 2021 the album was polled 87th on the list of 100 best Serbian rock albums published after the breakup of SFR Yugoslavia. The list was published in the book Kako (ni)je propao rokenrol u Srbiji (How Rock 'n' Roll in Serbia (Didn't) Came to an End).

References

Further reading 
 EX YU ROCK enciklopedija 1960-2006,  Janjatović Petar;  

Galija albums
1994 albums
PGP-RTS albums